The women's triple jump event at the 2019 European Athletics U23 Championships was held in Gävle, Sweden, at Gavlehov Stadium Park on 11 and 12 July.

Medalists

Results

Qualification
Qualification rule: 13.40 (Q) or the 12 best results (q) qualified for the final.

Final

References

Triple
Triple jump at the European Athletics U23 Championships